Moltkiopsis is a monotypic genus of flowering plants belonging to the family Boraginaceae. The only species is Moltkiopsis ciliata.

Its native range is northern Africa to Sahel and the Arabian Peninsula. It is found in the regions of Algeria, Chad, Egypt, the Gulf States, Iran, Iraq, Kuwait, Libya, Mali, Mauritania, Morocco, Niger, Oman, Palestine, Saudi Arabia, Sinai, Sudan, Tunisia and the western Sahara.

The genus name of Moltkiopsis is in honour of Joachim Godske Moltke (1746–1818), the Prime Minister of Denmark from 1814 to 1818. He was also father of Prime Minister Adam Wilhelm Moltke and the son of Danish diplomat Adam Gottlob Moltke. The Latin specific epithet of ciliata 	is derived from ciliatus meaning fringed.
Both genus and species were first described and published in J. Arnold Arbor. Vol.34 on pages 2-3 in 1953.

References

Boraginoideae
Boraginaceae genera
Monotypic asterid genera
Plants described in 1953
Flora of North Africa
Flora of Northeast Tropical Africa
Flora of Western Asia
Flora of the Arabian Peninsula